The 2017 season was Club de Regatas Vasco da Gama's 119th complete calendar year in existence, the club's 102nd season in existence of football, and the club's 44th season playing in the Brasileirão Série A, the top flight of Brazilian football.

Players

Squad information 

As of 22 July 2017.

from Vasco da Gama (B) (reserve team)

Out on loan

Transfers

In

Loan in

from Youth system

On trial (in)

Out

Loan out

to Youth system

On trial (out)

Pre-season and friendlies

Florida Cup

Florida Cup squad

Matches

Competitions 
Times from 1 January to 17 February 2017 and from 15 October to 31 December 2017 are UTC–2, from 18 February 2017 to 14 October 2017 UTC–3.

Brasileirão Série A

League table

Results summary

Result round by round

Matches

Copa do Brasil

Matches

Rio de Janeiro State Championship

Statistics

Squad appearances and goals 
Last updated on 3 December 2017.

|-
! colspan=14 style=background:#dcdcdc; text-align:center|Goalkeepers

|-
! colspan=14 style=background:#dcdcdc; text-align:center|Defenders

|-
! colspan=14 style=background:#dcdcdc; text-align:center|Midfielders

|-
! colspan=14 style=background:#dcdcdc; text-align:center|Forwards

|-
! colspan=14 style=background:#dcdcdc; text-align:center| Players who have made an appearance or had a squad number this season but have transferred or loaned out during the season

|-
|}

Notes

References

External links 

CR Vasco da Gama
Club de Regatas Vasco da Gama seasons
Vasco da Gama